John Paine may refer to:

John Paine (North Carolina politician), 18th Century politician
John Paine (sport shooter) (1870–1951), American shooter, competed at the 1896 Olympics
John Paine (cricketer) (1829–1859), English cricketer
John Paine (weightlifter), British Olympic weightlifter
John Alsop Paine (1840–1912), American botanist and Presbyterian minister
John Knowles Paine (1839–1906), American composer
Saint John Paine (1532–1582), English Catholic priest and martyr

See also
John Payne (disambiguation)